Pearl Ladderbanks (also Hartbourne) is a fictional character from the British ITV soap opera Emmerdale, played by Meg Johnson. She first appeared on the show in episode 3500 on 30 July 2003.

Pearl's storylines include defending her rapist son Frank Bernard Hartbourne (Rob Parry), being trapped in a fire during the Sugden house explosion, developing a gambling addiction, committing embezzlement in order to feed her gambling, and faking Alzheimer's disease to prevent her addiction from being revealed.

Johnson took an extended break from her role as Pearl during 2019, with Pearl last appearing on 18 July 2019. Pearl was off-screen until 13 January 2020, when it was revealed on-screen that Pearl had been away from the village on a caravan holiday. The character made a handful of guest appearances until the COVID-19 pandemic in the United Kingdom caused the character to stop appearing due to Johnson's age. Her last appearance aired on 30 March 2020.

Storylines
Pearl arrived in the village and caught Len Reynolds (Peter Martin) and Jarvis Skelton (Richard Moore)'s attention. She was branded a "trollop" by the prim Edna Birch (Shirley Stelfox). Pearl and Len eventually got together, and Len proposed in church one day. She accepted and the couple settled down together. It looked like they were heading for a happy-ever-after, but Len and Pearl’s relationship was tested to its limit by Pearl's terrible secret. Her son Frank Bernard Hartbourne, who she claimed was a financial advisor, was released from prison in 2004 after completing a sentence for rape. Len nearly ended things with Pearl but agreed to stand by her.

Frank Bernard stayed with Len and Pearl in the village, but his arrival was announced in the local paper and the villagers turned against Pearl and Len, leaving only vicar Ashley Thomas (John Middleton) standing by them. Frank was beaten up by Scott Windsor (Ben Freeman) and Syd Woolfe after a misunderstanding involving Scott's sister, Donna (Verity Rushworth). Frank realised his presence was harming his mother and moved to Leeds. The couple nearly moved away due to the village's treatment of them, but were persuaded to stay and rebuild their lives.

When she started work at Pollard's factory, Pearl soon made friends with fellow seamstresses Del Dingle (Hayley Tamaddon) and Val Lambert (Charlie Hardwick). She was delighted when her grandson Owen – son of her son Frank – visited. Owen and his mother live in Hong Kong and put Pearl in a difficult position when he asked where his father was buried. Pearl told Owen the truth about his father and Owen admitted that he already knew, having found the details on the internet. He merely wanted someone in his family to tell him the truth. Consequently, Pearl and Owen became close, and she planned to visit him in Hong Kong, going on an economy drive to save up.

Having started using the Internet for email, Pearl found a get-rich-quick scheme and invested. She later discovered it was a scam. Unfortunately, her friends had invested too, and Pearl felt obliged to pay them herself. She borrowed money from Pollard and was soon in debt. When Len found out, he was horrified but helped pay it off, thinking the matter was resolved. However, he didn’t know Pollard was blackmailing Pearl over an early payment penalty clause in the contract she had signed. Horrified by the mess she had created, Pearl secretly left the village, leaving her engagement ring and a letter for Len.

Eventually, Pearl was found working in Leeds under a false name – Irene. After her picture appeared in the paper, her boss confronted her, and he tried convincing her to ring home. She did, but only after she bumped into Daz Eden (Luke Tittensor), bruised and running away from his mother and her boyfriend. They agreed to return to the village together and were welcomed by their family and friends. Over time, the villagers grew to trust Pearl again and she reconciled with Len.

Pearl needed a job, so Edna helped her get the housekeeper's job at Home Farm and became a key witness when Tom was murdered. She, like most of the villagers, was at Home Farm that night. Pearl overheard Kelly Windsor (Adele Silva) and Jimmy King (Nick Miles) discussing his alibi so Pearl realised Kelly was lying when she said she had been with Jimmy when Tom died. Pearl knew because she saw Kelly alone at the time. After confronting her, Jimmy intimidated and blackmailed Pearl to keep her quiet. Unfortunately for them, she quit and went to the police.

Pearl naively thought Eric Pollard (Chris Chittell) was her friend, helping her after Len died and returned the favour by making cakes for him. Jasmine told Pearl the truth after she found out from Eric's son, David, who she was dating at the time. Pearl and her friends Edna, Terry Woods's father, Duke and Alan were livid, calling Eric a bully and a coward.

When Douglas, Laurel Thomas's father, was grieving after the death of his grandson, Daniel, in February 2008, Pearl supported him. Edna and Betty were concerned about her intentions and Edna advised Pearl not to visit Doug after Daniel's memorial service. Pearl realised what Edna was implying and furiously told her she had a filthy mind. Pearl wanted some company as she was lonely so Edna's sister Lily Butterfield (Anne Charleston) moved in with her. They became good friends and started a syndicate with Betty and Edna, entering competitions. Pearl won tickets for a Baltic cruise but could not decide whom to take with her so Betty and Lily started buttering her up. They were shocked when she started dating Joe Jacobs (John Woodvine), an old friend of Sandy Thomas (Freddie Jones), Ashley's father.

Betty and Lily convinced her he only cared about the cruise ticket, but he explained that he'd spent most of his career at sea, and had no desire to go on the water again. Pearl eventually took Lily, but she was so controlling that Joe dropped a suitcase on her foot, meaning she had to miss the cruise, due to her injuries. Betty was not interested, so Pearl, realising Joe had feelings for her, gave him the ticket. Pearl returned alone and initially would not talk about Joe but later confessed that he had been thrown off the ship for "lewd behaviour". Lily also worked at Pollards' factory and some of the factory girls clubbed together to buy a raffle ticket from Rodney. When they didn't hear anything, they assumed they had not won until Gennie saw an article in the paper about an unclaimed prize. Pearl called the hotline and discovered they'd won a car which they planned to sell and split the money. Lily intended to give her share to her son, Peter, who was in financial trouble but was persuaded to give him the ticket. Lily convinced everyone Pearl had got the number wrong and because of that, she'd thrown the ticket away. Pearl was mortified but Val was suspicious after seeing an article in the local paper about the winner of the unclaimed prize. After some digging, she guessed that Lily had given the ticket to Peter and Lily confessed when Edna confronted her. Lily promised to repay the money that her friends should have had.

She joined the church choir in November 2008, and in December, was there to help Lily and Edna through Lily's brain operation. In early 2009, Natasha Wylde (Amanda Donohoe) announced plans to open a shop with natural foods. Betty and Pearl were very competitive over their jam recipes, but Pearl won. To her annoyance, when the shop opened in July, another woman's face was on the front of the jars. Natasha calmed her by giving her vouchers, telling her that she also wanted to respect her privacy.

The arrival of Vanessa Woodfield (Michelle Hardwick) in December 2012 annoys Pearl, as Vanessa is constantly trying to force her into leaving her job because of her age. The feud only escalates when it is discovered that Rhona Goskirk (Zoe Henry) has been taking drugs supplied by Vanessa. The funeral of Alan Turner (Richard Thorp) in October 2013 deeply upsets Pearl and she for a few days is too upset to go out. However, she is present at the reopening of The Woolpack, which was damaged in Cameron Murray's (Dominic Power) hostage siege. Presently, she is working as the receptionist at the vet's.

Pearl was brought back to the forefront at the beginning of 2015 when she developed an online gambling addiction. She received large bills that needed paying and resorted to stealing from Paddy and Rhona and writing down what she owed in an IOU book which Vanessa eventually found. Edna also confronted Pearl about her stealing and Paddy and Rhona later discovered her betrayal. Paddy fired Pearl from the vet's. She gives all the money she has to Ashley so he can give it to Paddy and Rhona, and she tells Edna that she plans to leave the village. Edna alerts Paddy and Rhona. They intervene in Pearl's plan and reconcile. Following her gambling, Pollard kicked Pearl out of her home, and she went to live with Paddy and Rhona. She was known to gossip along with her friend, Betty.

After Rhona discovered Paddy's affair, Pearl was asked to move out in March 2016 so she moved in with Harriet and tried to set her up with Daniel, a client at the vet.

Creation
In 2003, it was revealed that Edna Birch was to get a new sparring partner. Meg Johnson, who had previously appeared in Brookside as Brigid McKenna, was cast as Pearl. Johnson promised that Pearl’s arrival would put Edna’s nose out of joint also saying: "Edna is shocked at her brashness and how she flirts with the men. Pearl won’t stand any messing though and she’s quite rude to Edna, but in a funny way." It was also revealed that Pearl would make an impression in the community in other ways, such as her wild dress sense. Johnson explained: "It's outrageous! She loves flowery and colourful clothes – there’s a lot of pink in her wardrobe. You never see Pearl out without her face on and her hair done."

Development
Pearl formed an attraction to Len Reynolds, portrayed by Peter Martin. Martin explained: "When Pearl turns up on the scene, she's this glamorous older lady with designs on Len and to be honest with you, I think he's a bit frightened of her, It's a long time since his wife died, and he's not used to female attention, so he just wants to run a mile and Len prefers Edna, despite her reputation as village battle-ax. His feelings for her have developed over time. Everyone else thinks she's a witch, but Len sees a good side to her, and really likes her."

See also
List of Emmerdale characters (2003)

References

External links 
 Pearl Ladderbanks at itv.com
 Character profile at Holy Soap

Emmerdale characters
Television characters introduced in 2003
Female characters in television
Fictional factory workers
Fictional receptionists
Fictional criminals in soap operas
Fictional white-collar criminals
Fictional gamblers